Clare  is a given name, the Medieval English form of Clara. The related name Clair was traditionally considered male,  especially when spelled without an 'e',  but Clare and Claire are usually female.

It is very often associated with the Irish County Clare. That name was derived from the Irish word ('Clár') given to a small bridge that crossed the River Fergus near the town of Ennis in what is now County Clare.

Women
 Saint Clare of Assisi (1194–1253), foundress of the Order of Poor Ladies (Poor Clares) and companion of Saint Francis
 Saint Clare of Montefalco, Augustinian Catholic saint
 Blessed Clare of Rimini, beatified Poor Clare nun
 Clare Abbott (born 1921), South African artist
 Clare Adamson (born 1967), British politician
 Clare Akamanzi (born 1979), Rwandan politician
 Clare Asquith (born 1951), British scholar
 Clare Atwood (1866–1962), British painter
 Clare Azzopardi (born 1977), Maltese writer
 Clare Bailey (born 1970), British politician
 Clare Balding (born 1971), British sports presenter
 Clare Baldwin, American journalist
 Clare Buckfield, English actress
 Clare Butler, Canadian actress and ballet dancer
 Clare Colvin, British writer
 Clare Eichner, American distance runner
 Clare Grey, British chemist
 Clare Hastings, British author, fashion journalist, stylist and costume designer
 Clare Kummer (1873–1958), American composer, lyricist and playwright
 Clare Boothe Luce, American writer, politician, and ambassador
 Clare Maguire (born 1987), British singer-songwriter
 Clare Martin (born 1952), Australian politician
 Clare McCann, Irish/Australian actress, singer, dancer, filmmaker and activist
 Clare Moody (born 1965), British politician
 Clare Mulley (born 1969), British author and historian
 Clare Nasir (born 1970), British meteorologist
 Clare Nott (born 1986), Australian wheelchair basketball player
 Clare Parnell (born 1970), British astrophysicist and applied mathematician
 Clare Potter (1903–1999), American fashion designer
 Clare Short (born 1948), British politician
 Clare Twomey (born 1968), British artist
 Clare Venema, Australian model
 Clare Wheatley (born 1971), British football player and administrator

Men 
 Clare Berryhill (1925–1996), American politician
 Clare Briggs (1875–1930), American comic strip artist 
 Clare Drake (1928–2018), Canadian retired ice hockey head coach
 Clare Victor Dwiggins (1874–1958), American cartoonist and illustrator
 Clare Fischer (1928–2012), American musician
 Clare W. Graves (1914–1986), American professor of psychology
 Clare Hoffman (1875–1967), United States Representative from Michigan's 4th congressional district.
 Clare Jacobs (1886–1971), American pole vaulter
 George "Clare" Martin (1922–1980), Canadian ice hockey player

Fictional characters
Clare Devlin in Derry Girls
Clare in the British comic strip Clare in the Community
 Clare, the main character from the manga and anime Claymore
 Clare (Power Rangers) in the series Power Rangers: Mystic Force
 Clare Abshire in the novel The Time Traveler's Wife by Audrey Niffenegger
 Clare Arnold in the 1990s television drama Beverly Hills, 90210
 Clare Devine in the British soap opera Hollyoaks
 Clare Edwards in the Canadian television drama Degrassi: The Next Generation
 Clare Quilty, a male character in Lolita
 Clare Kendry in Nella Larsen's novel Passing
 Clare Bleecker in Don Roff's novel Clare at Sixteen
 Clare Fishburn in Annie Dillard's novel "The Living"

See also
 Clare (surname)
 Clare (disambiguation)
 Clara (given name)
 Claire (given name)
 Sinclair (surname)

References

English feminine given names
English masculine given names
Feminine given names